The 2021 İstanbul Cup (also known as the TEB BNP Paribas Tennis Championship İstanbul for sponsorship reasons) is a tennis tournament played on outdoor clay courts. It is the 14th edition of the İstanbul Cup, and part of the WTA International tournaments of the 2021 WTA Tour. It took place in Istanbul, Turkey, from 19 through 25 April 2021.

Points and prize money

Prize money

Champions

Singles

  Sorana Cîrstea def.  Elise Mertens, 6–1, 7–6(7-3)

Doubles

  Veronika Kudermetova /  Elise Mertens def.  Nao Hibino /  Makoto Ninomiya, 6–1, 6–1.

Singles main-draw entrants

Seeds

 Rankings are as of April 12, 2021.

Other entrants
The following players received wildcards into the singles main draw:
  Çağla Büyükakçay 
  Ana Konjuh
  Elise Mertens
  Vera Zvonareva

The following players received entry from the qualifying draw:
  Lara Arruabarrena
  Cristina Bucșa
  Anastasia Gasanova
  Tereza Mrdeža
  Nuria Párrizas Díaz
  Kamilla Rakhimova

The following player received entry as a lucky loser:
  Barbara Haas

Withdrawals
Before the tournament
  Alizé Cornet → replaced by  Zarina Diyas
  Svetlana Kuznetsova → replaced by  Kateřina Siniaková
  Magda Linette → replaced by  Nao Hibino
  Yulia Putintseva → replaced by  Sara Errani
  Anastasija Sevastova → replaced by  Marta Kostyuk
  Sara Sorribes Tormo → replaced by  Anastasia Potapova
  Jil Teichmann → replaced by  Viktorija Golubic
  Patricia Maria Țig → replaced by  Ana Bogdan
  Zheng Saisai → replaced by  Barbara Haas

Retirements
  Fiona Ferro

Doubles main-draw entrants

Seeds 

 1 Rankings as of April 12, 2021.

Other entrants 
The following pairs received wildcards into the doubles main draw:
  Çağla Büyükakçay /  Pemra Özgen
  Elena Vesnina /  Vera Zvonareva

The following pairs received entry using protected rankings:
  Viktorija Golubic /  Alexandra Panova
  Beatrice Gumulya /  Jessy Rompies

Withdrawals 
Before the tournament
  Arantxa Rus /  Tamara Zidanšek → replaced by  Beatrice Gumulya /  Jessy Rompies

References

External links
 Official page 

2021 in Istanbul
2021 in Turkish tennis
2021 WTA Tour
April 2021 sports events in Turkey
2021 İstanbul Cup